The President Costa e Silva Bridge, commonly known as the Rio–Niterói Bridge, is a box girder bridge crossing Guanabara Bay, in the State of Rio de Janeiro in Brazil. It connects the cities of Rio de Janeiro and Niterói. It is currently the second longest bridge in Latin America, after the Metro Line 1 bridge, and the  48th longest in the world in 2020. From its completion in 1974 until 1985 it was the world's second-longest bridge, second only to the Lake Pontchartrain Causeway.

At the time it was completed, the central span was the longest box girder in the world; it has since been surpassed by the  main span of the Stolma Bridge (1998) and the  main span of the second Shibanpo Bridge (2006). It carries over 150,000 vehicles daily, which pay a toll only when entering Niterói of R$4.30 (as of June 2018), about US$1.10, GBP£0.85 or €0.97. It has 18 access points and eight overpasses.

Officially, it is part of federal highway BR-101. From 1 June 1995,  it was under the management of Ponte S.A. under a 20-year concession until 1 June 2015 since when Ecoponte has managed the bridge.

History

The concept dates to 1875, when a bridge-and-tunnel connection was envisioned between two cities separated by Guanabara Bay and connected by road only via inland journey of more than  through the city of Magé.

In 1963, a working group was created to study a bridge-building project. On 29 December 1965, an executive committee was formed to run the bridge-building program. President Artur da Costa e Silva signed a decree on 23 August 1968, authorizing the project for the bridge. The bridge program was run by Minister of Transport  Mario Andreazza.

Construction began symbolically on 9 November 1968, in the presence of Queen Elizabeth II of the United Kingdom  on her only visit to Brazil. Actual work began in December 1968 

Initially, the bridge was constructed by a consortium of Brazilian companies led by Camargo Correa SA (for the concrete works) and by Cleveland Bridge & Engineering Company and Redpath Dorman Long in association with Montreal Engenharia of Brazil (for the steel navigation spans).  On January 26, 1971, President Emílio Garrastazu Médici signed a decree taking control of the consortium.

The bridge opened on Monday, 4 March 1974, with the official name of President Costa e Silva Bridge. "Rio-Niterói" started as a descriptive nickname that soon became better known than the official name.  Today hardly anyone refers to it by its official name.

In 2012 a bill was introduced to change its official name, President Costa e Silva Bridge - the second president of the Brazilian military dictatorship between 1964 and 1985 -  to Herbert de Souza Bridge, which has annoyed the Brazilian military.

Controversy 
Officially, 33 people died during the construction of the bridge. Unofficial estimates put the death toll in excess of 400. Some people suggested that workers were buried within the concrete, but engineer Bruno Contarini contested that by saying, "There wasn’t even concrete when one of the foundations toppled over during the load test and eight people died. If any bodies were not rescued, it’s because they disappeared in the bay, not because they were buried in concrete ."

Pop Culture 
In 1977, the famous Brazilian singer Maysa died in a car crash on the bridge.

In 2011, the bridge was featured in the film Fast Five. The Puerto Rican bridge Teodoro Moscoso doubled for the bridge during the last moments of the film.

Gallery

References

External links

 Official website with live feed from the bridge's surveillance cameras: Ponte S.A. homepage
 Satellite picture by Google Maps
 Photo Gallery driving over the bridge

Bridges in Rio de Janeiro (city)
Guanabara Bay
Niterói
Box girder bridges
Bridges in Brazil
Road bridges
Toll bridges
Bridges completed in 1974
Buildings and structures in Rio de Janeiro (state)